Tserakvi is a Georgian Orthodox monastic complex in Kvemo Kartli, Georgia, dating from the 12th-13th century. The monument is located near the eponymous village in the Marneuli Municipality, flanked by the  river. The complex includes the churches of the Assumption and of St. George as well as a bell tower, a wine cellar, and fragments of a defensive wall. The church of the Assumption is a three-nave hall church and contains a wall inscription from the 15th century.

References 

Georgian Orthodox monasteries
Buildings and structures in Kvemo Kartli